Olivia Hofmann (born 8 August 1992) is an Austrian sports shooter. She competed in the women's 10 metre air rifle event at the 2016 Summer Olympics.

References

External links
 

1992 births
Living people
Austrian female sport shooters
Olympic shooters of Austria
Shooters at the 2016 Summer Olympics
ISSF rifle shooters
Sportspeople from Innsbruck
Shooters at the 2015 European Games
European Games medalists in shooting
European Games bronze medalists for Austria
Shooters at the 2019 European Games
21st-century Austrian women